The Rozenburg refinery is an oil refinery owned by Kuwait Petroleum Europort BV which is a subsidiary of Kuwait Petroleum International, KPI.  It is sometimes referred to as the Europort refinery.  The refinery capacity is 4 mtpa (80 kbpd) of crude oil.  And has a Nelson complexity index of approximately 6.

See also
 Oil refinery
 Petroleum
 List of oil refineries

External links
 Q8 Refineries

Oil refineries in the Netherlands
Port of Rotterdam